Barack Obama sponsored 147 bills from January 4, 2005 until November 16, 2008. Two became law.  This figure does not include bills to which Obama contributed as cosponsor, such as the Coburn-Obama Federal Funding Accountability and Transparency Act of 2006 or the Lugar-Nunn Cooperative Proliferation Detection, Interdiction Assistance, and Conventional Threat Reduction Act of 2006.  Nor does it include amendments to other bills, although in the Senate these are not required to be germane to the parent bill and can therefore effectively be bills in their own right.  During the same time period, Obama has co-sponsored 689 bills in total; 408 of which had secured his support by the day they were originally introduced in the Senate.

Review

The focus of legislation reflects his minority party appointments in Senate Resolution 6 of the 109th Congress to the Committee on Environment and Public Works, the Committee on Foreign Relations, and the Committee on Veterans' Affairs, and subsequent majority party appointments in the 110th Congress to the latter two committees and the Committee on Health, Education, Labor, and Pensions and the Committee on Homeland Security and Governmental Affairs.

Table
Note: The information presented here is derived from thomas.loc.gov, but in some cases may be out of date. Also, these bills were not exclusively created nor singularly supported by Barack Obama.

The status of Obama's bills and resolutions as noted in the below table is in accordance with thomas.loc.gov. Introduced in the Senate (IS) refers to bills pending approval in committee. Reported to the Senate (RS) refers to bills that have received favorable report in committee and may be placed on the calendar for vote. Approved by the Senate (ATS) describes bills which have gained approval.  Govtrack links from this column provide updated status, summaries, and full text of the bills.

See also
Barack Obama
Political positions of Barack Obama
Barack Obama presidential campaign, 2008

References

External links
legislative information  from THOMAS at the Library of Congress
Barack Obama Bill Sponsorship 2007-2008 (the 110th Congress) from Govtrack.us

Bills sponsored by Barack Obama in the United States Senate
Bills sponsored by Barack Obama in he United States Senate
Bills sponsored in the Unites States Senate
Obama, Barack